The Love Punch is a 2013 British comedy film written and directed by Joel Hopkins. It was screened in the Gala Presentation section at the 2013 Toronto International Film Festival.

Plot
Richard (Pierce Brosnan) and Kate Jones (Emma Thompson) are divorcees with two children Sophie and Matt. Richard's company is sold to a corrupt French businessman, Vincent (Laurent Lafitte), and the company's pension plan is lost, including all of Richard and Kate's investments for the whole family. They go to Paris and confront Vincent, where Vincent does not deny all the things he did legally, if not morally. Richard and Kate plot to get their money back. They find out that Vincent is marrying his beautiful girlfriend, Manon (Louise Bourgoin). They plan to steal the diamond Vincent gave to Manon, which is worth over $10 million, intending for this to replace the pension money Vincent took from the company.

Learning of Vincent's upcoming wedding, Richard and Kate follow Vincent and Manon to the south of France. After Kate makes contact with Manon at a beach party, Richard and Kate enlist their friends Jerry and Penelope to help them impersonate a group of Texans attending the party, with the intention that they will infiltrate the party and switch the diamond for a fake, also passing on the diamond to Jerry and Penelope so that they will not be suspected. Having infiltrated the wedding, the Joneses attempt to take the diamond, but are interrupted by a tearful Manon, who confesses her doubts about the wedding to Kate. After Kate offers her advice on marriage, Manon learns about their motives for being there and decides to give them the diamond of her own free will. Vincent realizes the switch after Manon officially calls the wedding off, but Jerry and Penelope are able to get out with the diamond after Jerry swallows it. Richard and Kate are nearly sent over a cliff in a van, but Manon is able to intercept the van and save them, allowing Kate to call a contact with a boat to pick them up.

Selling the diamond to a contact of Jerry's for $15 million, Richard and Kate decide to spend some time traveling while Jerry and Penelope take the money back to donate it to Richard's former employees.

Cast
 Emma Thompson as Kate Jones
 Pierce Brosnan as Richard Jones
 Celia Imrie as Penelope
 Timothy Spall as Jerry
 Louise Bourgoin as Manon Fontane
 Laurent Lafitte as Vincent Kruger
 Marisa Berenson as Catherine
 Olivier Chantreau as Jean-Baptiste Durain
 Ellen Thomas as Doreen
 Tuppence Middleton as Sophie Jones
 Jack Wilkinson as Matt Jones
 Adam Byron as Tyler
 John Ramm as Ken
 Eleanor Matsuura as Michaela
 Linda Hardy as Glaxo secretary
 Sabine Crossen as Texan couple woman 1
 Julie Ordon as Girl 1 beach club
 Tom Morton as Tim
 Catriona MacColl as Wedding guest

Reception
Peter Bradshaw, writing in The Guardian, gave the film 3 stars saying that it is an "entirely ridiculous, cheerfully daft and very amiable midlife comedy".

References

External links
 
 

2010s British films
2010s English-language films
2010s heist films
2013 films
2013 comedy films
British comedy films
British heist films
Comedy of remarriage films
Films set in Paris
Films set in Cannes